Mard is a 1998 Indian Hindi-language Indian action film directed by Ganpati Bohra and produced by Sunil Kumar Bohra, starring Mithun Chakraborty, Kader Khan, Gulshan Grover, Raza Murad, Shakti Kapoor and Ravali.

Plot
Mard is an action film starring Mithun Chakraborty. Assistant Commissioner Of Police Arjun (Mithun Chakraborty) is an honest police officer who gets transferred regularly. As a punishment for his impeccable integrity Arjun is sent to a police station which is a part of the area ruled by underworld don Satya Lal (Gulshan Grover). Satyalal has the local Police and the Home ministry Deen Dayal Chaudhary (Pramod Moutho) under his control and wants to cut ACP Arjun to size. Will Arjun be able to stand up against the odds and defeat Satyalal.

Cast
Mithun Chakraborty as ACP Arjun Khanna 
Ravali as Kammo
Kader Khan as Gulam Kalim Azat
Adi Irani as Abdul Kalim Azat
Gulshan Grover as Satya Lal
Raza Murad as DGP
Shakti Kapoor as Jaffer
Johnny Lever as Bindas
Lekha Govil as Bindas's Mother
Pramod Moutho as Chief Minister Dayal Chaudhary 
Tej Sapru as Police inspector
Jack Gaud as Ratan
Vishwajeet Pradhan as Sohan Lal
Altaf Raja as singer
Ashwin Kaushal as Mohan Lal
Ashalata Kashmiri
Asha Sharma as victim girl's
Mitran
Ram-Laxman
Amrish

Music
"Peelo Ishq Di Whisky" - Altaf Raja
"Dil Dhadak Mera Jaaye Re" - Poornima, Lalit Sen
"Aaj Kisiki Jeet Hui" - Kavita Krishnamurthy, Mohammed Aziz
"Ankhon Mein Hai Kya" - Kumar Sanu, Alka Yagnik
"Tu Apna Kaam Karle" - Sapna Awasthi, Devang Patel

References

External links
 

1998 films
1990s Hindi-language films
Mithun's Dream Factory films
Films shot in Ooty
Films scored by Dilip Sen-Sameer Sen
Indian action films